Jauerfood was a company founded in 1956 in Copenhagen, Denmark, by Gunnar Jauer. Jauerfood's primary focus was to supply East German residents with food, bought via Jauerfood and paid by friends and relatives in the West or by the East German residents' West German savings and bank accounts. 

From 1959 and on East Germany did not allow its citizens to withdraw their funds put in West German banks, hence many East Germany citizens had substantial savings that they could not utilize. Jauerfood (and the Swiss, Zürich-based company Palatinus) agreed with the East German Trade association Genex to export goods into East Germany, in return for a 5% commission to Genex.

Through the 1960s, 1970s, and 1980s, the trade grew: in the last fully operative year 1988 - just before the Wall fell, Jauerfood's gross earnings was approximately US$175,000,000 . 

By the end of 1989, the company's reason for being had vanished, due to the new open structure in Germany, opening East Germany up to free trade.

Defunct companies of Denmark
Economy of East Germany